The First English Language School (FELS, 114th High School "Liliana Dimitrova") was founded in 1958 in Sofia, Bulgaria as a high school for education in English language to Bulgarian students.

The school is located at 60 Dondukov Street since 1960 and shares the building with the 112th Elementary School. FELS became a UNESCO associated school in 1978.

It is considered to be one of the most prestigious public high schools in the country. Over 90% of its graduates pursue their higher education in schools and universities in Bulgaria, the EU and the United States.

Administration 
Ms. Bonka Bachvarova was the school's principal for many years, followed by Ms. Nellie Mladenova. The acting principal is Ms. Nelly Petrova.

Rankings 
In 2022, the school was in third place for most student applications for 8th grade in Sofia after dropping from the first position in 2021.

Student clubs 

 Interact club "Sofia-Tangra" - a club for organising different charity events, part of the Rotary International program in Bulgaria;
 "Young Wings" - for the lovers of aviation and astronautics;
 People to People International (PTPI) - "The doves chapter" is a student branch of the People to People International organisation, 
 Club "Zelen domat" - a journalism club which publishes a newspaper dedicated to the school;
 Eco-bio club "Green clover" - dedicated to nature, biology and environmental protection;
 Debates club
 Model European Parliament (MEP) - established in 1994 to introduce young people to the process of European integration and to strengthen their interest in European belonging, sessions are organized twice a year in different European countries, where the work of the real European Parliament is simulated;
 Drama club;
 Fashion design Club;
 Photoclub FELS;
 Club of the Bulgarian Youth Red Cross - a club for students who want to learn more about first aid help, prevention from addiction, and social assistance, with association with the Bulgarian Red Cross;
 Patriotism and National Studies - a new initiative with the goal to preserve patriotims and teach students about Bulgarian traditions and literature;
 Club "UN" -  related to international relations, politics and economics;
 Folk dance troupe - a dance group performing traditional Bulgarian folk dancing;
 Cheerleading club;
 Orchestra club - an emblem for the school with 40 years history, more than 30 members playing different instruments;
 Bulgarian Interplanetary Society - physics and aerospace engineering club, in partnership with the Mathematic School of Sofia club;
 "The Manchines" - a dancing club;
 "Acrobatic rock'n'roll" - a club combining dancing and rock and roll music;
 Sports club;
 "Informatics" - for students interested in digital technology and artificial intelligence;
 Club "Culinary experts" - dedicated to sharing recipes and cooking.

Notable alumni 
 Miryana Basheva - Bulgarian poet and lyricist; 
 Georgi Bliznashki - caretaker Prime Minister of Bulgaria (2014);
 Irina Bokova - Bulgarian politician, Director-General of UNESCO;
 Philip Dimitrov Dimitrov - Bulgarian politician and former prime-minister of Bulgaria (1991–1992); 
 Ognyan Doynov - Bulgarian diplomat and cabinet member from the communist period; 
 Lubomir Kuychukov - a deputy foreign minister of Bulgaria;
 Veni Markovski - internet pioneer and founder of the Bulgarian Internet Society; 
 Bashar Rahal - actor, producer;
 Galina Toneva - Bulgaria's Deputy Chief Prosecutor; 
 Ralitsa Vassileva - anchor for CNN World News; 
 Boris Velchev - lawyer, member of the Constitutional court of Bulgaria, and former chief prosecutor (attorney-general) in the history of Bulgaria.

References

External links 
 FELS official website: http://www.fels-sofia.org/
 Other alumni websites: ; 
 Miscellaneous news and articles links: ; 

Schools in Sofia
Educational institutions established in 1958
1958 establishments in Bulgaria